Antonis Michaloglou (Greek: Αντώνης Μιχάλογλου; born April 9, 1988) is a Greek professional basketball player. Born in Athens, Greece, he is a 2.06 m (6 ft 8.75 in) tall power forward-center.

Professional career
On August 20, 2016, Michaloglou joined Koroivos Amaliadas of the Greek Basket League.

References

External links
FIBA Profile
FIBA Europe Profile
EuroCup Profile
Eurobasket.com Profile
RealGM.com Profile

1988 births
Living people
AEK B.C. players
Arkadikos B.C. players
Centers (basketball)
Doukas B.C. players
Greek Basket League players
Ilysiakos B.C. players
Iraklis Thessaloniki B.C. players
Koroivos B.C. players
Pagrati B.C. players
Basketball players from Athens